The 2014 Players Tour Championship Grand Final (officially the 2014 Wyldecrest Parks Players Championship Grand Final) was a professional ranking snooker tournament that took place between 25 and 29 March 2014 at the Guild Hall in Preston, England. It was the tenth ranking event of the 2013/2014 season.

It was originally planned, that the event would take place in Bangkok, Thailand, but due to the political unrest in the country the World Professional Billiards and Snooker Association decided to relocate the event. This was the first professional tournament at the Guild Hall since the 2005 Grand Prix.

Ding Junhui was the defending champion, but he lost 3–4 against Ben Woollaston in the last 32.

Barry Hawkins won his second ranking title by defeating Gerard Greene 4–0 in the final. This was Greene's first ranking final.

Prize fund and ranking points
The breakdown of prize money and ranking points of the event is shown below:

Seeding list
The players competed in 12 minor-ranking tournaments to earn points for the European Tour and Asian Tour Order of Merits. The seeding list of the Finals was based on the combined list from the earnings of both Order of Merits.

Main draw

Final

Century breaks

 140, 109  Ronnie O'Sullivan
 136, 113, 107  Mark Allen
 133, 128, 123, 121  Joe Perry
 131, 117  Barry Hawkins
 130  Jimmy Robertson
 126  Anthony Hamilton
 121, 102  Marco Fu
 111  John Higgins
 102  Yu Delu

References

External links
 Players Championship Grand Final 2014 – Day 1 at Facebook
 Players Championship Grand Final 2014 – Day 2 at Facebook
 Players Championship Grand Final 2014 – Day 3 at Facebook
 Players Championship Grand Final 2014 – Day 4 at Facebook
 Players Championship Grand Final 2014 – Day 5 at Facebook

2014
Finals
2014 in English sport
Snooker competitions in England
Sport in Preston
March 2014 sports events in the United Kingdom